The 1998 Belgian Cup Final, took place on 1 June 1997 between Germinal Ekeren and Anderlecht. It was the 42nd Belgian Cup final. Germinal Ekeren came back from a 0-2 deficit to force extra time and eventually came out 4-2 winners.

Route to the final

Match

Details

External links
  
 RSSSF Belgium Cups 1996/97

Belgian Cup finals
Cup Final